Bad Bakht is a Pakistani family drama  premiered on ARY Zindagi on 26 March 2018. It is produced by Fahad Mustafa under their banner Big Bang Entertainment. It stars Sabeena Syed and Fahad Shaikh in leads.

Cast 
Sabeena Syed as Amal, Javed/Kulsoom daughter
Fahad Shaikh as Armaan Abid Ali, Abid/Husna son
Furqan Qureshi as Khurram, Sughra's son
Natalia Awais as Alizeh, Armaan's younger sister
Kanwar Nafees as Faisal Abid Ali, Armaan's elder brother
Adnan Jilani as Javed, Amal's father
Faiza Gillani as Kulsoom, Amal's mother
Manzoor Qureshi as Abid Ali, Armaan's father and Javed's brother
Tabbasum Arif as Husna, Armaan's mother and Kulsoom's sister
Noshaba Javed as Sughra, Javed and Abid's sister
Esha Noor as Ayesha, Sughra's younger daughter
Saba Khan as Sumaiyya, Sughra's elder daughter
Kiran Abbasi/Maria Malik as Nida, Faisal's wife
Aroha Khan as Nimra, Javed's second wife
Iqra Manzoor as Sadia, Amal's friend
Zeeshan Ali Shah as Sameer, Alizeh love interest
Mehboob Sultan as Sultan, loves Nida but harasses her when she married Faisal
Ahad Khan as Rameez, Ayesha's love interest
Rehana Kaleem as Shahid's mother (guest appearance)
Ismat Zaidi as Nida's mother (guest appearance)
Zubair Akram as Shahid, Sumaiyya's husband (guest appearance)
Sameera Hassan as Sameer's mother (guest appearance)

References 

Pakistani drama television series
Urdu-language television shows
ARY Digital original programming
2018 Pakistani television series debuts
2018 Pakistani television series endings